St Peter's Church, also known as Huddersfield Parish Church, is a Church of England parish church in Huddersfield, West Yorkshire, England. There has been a church on the site since the 11th century, but the current building dates from 1836. It is situated on the Kirkgate near Southgate in the centre of the town. It is a Grade II* listed building.

History
In legend, the first church on the site was built in the eleventh century by Walter de Lacy, the second son of Ilbert de Lacy.  Walter decided to build the church after he survived being thrown from his horse and landing in a swamp.

The church was rebuilt in the sixteenth century. From 1759 to 1771, Henry Venn was vicar at the church.

By the early 19th century the town of Huddersfield was growing rapidly as a result of the industrial revolution and the parish church was too small to cope. In order to address this, Holy Trinity Church was opened in 1819 as a chapel of ease within the parish of St Peter's, before becoming a parish church in its own right in 1857.

By the 1830s the 16th-century parish church needed urgent repairs, and it was therefore decided to rebuild it again, so the congregation constructed the current church. The architect for the church was James Pigott Pritchett and construction was carried out from 1834 to 1836. To keep costs down during construction the bricks used were from the previous church on the site, this meant that repairs were needed overcome the deficient materials.

In 1851, two vestries were added at the eastern and northern ends of the church. In 1852, windows designed by Thomas Willement were installed in the church. In 1866, it was realised that the stonework of the church needed repairing. In 1873, new pews and a pulpit were installed. In 1879, a choir vestry was added.  Arthur Eaglefield Hull was the organist from 1904 to 1920. In 1908 an organ was installed by local builder Conacher and Co. It was restored in 1984 by Philip Wood of Huddersfield.

From 1921 to 1923, the sanctuary was reordered. A baldachin and the east window, designed by Ninian Comper, as part of a war memorial was also installed in the church. In the 1940s, the south transept was redesigned with a screen by Robert Thompson being added. In the 1980s, a new altar and dais were also installed. Around 2012, the roof, ceiling and tower were repaired. Other essential repairs were also made, helped by a grant from English Heritage.

On 17 June 1965 the church was the wedding place of Olympic athletes, swimmer Anita Lonsbrough and track cyclist Hugh Porter. On 17 February 2017, the church was the location of the funeral of Gorden Kaye, the Huddersfield-born television actor and star of 'Allo 'Allo!.

Parish
On weekdays, the church is open from 9:00am until 4:00pm and on Saturdays from 10:00am to 2:00pm. On Sundays, there is a Book of Common Prayer communion service at 8:00am, a parish communion service at 10:00am and evensong at 3:00pm.

Gallery

See also
 Grade II* listed buildings in Kirklees
 Listed buildings in Huddersfield (Newsome Ward - central area)
 Diocese of Leeds

References

External links

 Huddersfield Parish site

Saint Peters Church
Grade II* listed churches in West Yorkshire
Church of England church buildings in West Yorkshire
Churches completed in 1836
19th-century Church of England church buildings
Anglican Diocese of Leeds
Gothic Revival church buildings in England
Gothic Revival architecture in West Yorkshire
Anglo-Catholic church buildings in West Yorkshire